Sandeep Warrier (born 4 April 1991) is an Indian international cricketer. He made his international debut for the Indian cricket team in July 2021 against Sri Lanka. He is a right-arm medium-fast bowler who has played for Kerala and currently plays for Tamil Nadu in domestic cricket and Kolkata Knight Riders in the Indian Premier League.

Domestic career

Sandeep Warrier made his first-class debut for Kerala against Goa on 24 November 2012. In August 2018, he was one of five players that were suspended for three games in the 2018–19 Vijay Hazare Trophy, after showing dissent against Kerala's captain, Sachin Baby. He was the leading wicket-taker for Kerala in the 2018–19 Vijay Hazare Trophy, with twelve dismissals in six matches. He was the leading wicket-taker for Kerala in the group-stage of the 2018–19 Ranji Trophy, with 44 dismissals in ten matches. He took a hat-trick in the 2019 season of Syed Mushtaq Ali T20 Trophy. In August 2019, he was named in the India Red team's squad for the 2019–20 Duleep Trophy. In October 2019, he was named in India A's squad for the 2019–20 Deodhar Trophy. He moved to Tamil Nadu from Kerala on 2021.

International career
In January 2021, he was named as one of five net bowlers in India's Test squad for their series against England. In June 2021, he was named as one of five net bowlers for India's tour of Sri Lanka. Following a positive case for COVID-19 in the Indian team, Warrier was added to India's main squad for their final two Twenty20 International (T20I) matches of the tour. He made his T20I debut on 29 July 2021, for India against Sri Lanka.

Personal life
Sandeep was born on Thrissur to Sankarankutty and Lakshmi. He has a sister, Sandhya. He grew up and did his schooling in Mumbai and later moved to Kerala. He is an engineering dropout.

Sandeep married his long-time girlfriend Arathy Kasturiraj, an international skater in 2019.

Sandeep, along with his KKR teammate, Varun Chakravarthy, tested positive for COVID-19 on 3 May 2021. The IPL match between Kolkata Knight Riders and Royal Challengers Bangalore scheduled to take place that day was therefore postponed.

References

External links
 

Living people
1991 births
Indian cricketers
India Twenty20 International cricketers
Kerala cricketers
Cricketers from Thrissur
Royal Challengers Bangalore cricketers
South Zone cricketers
India Red cricketers
Kolkata Knight Riders cricketers